Aiea High School is a public high school of the Hawaii State Department of Education and serves grades nine through twelve.  Established in 1961, Aiea High School is located in the Aiea CDP, in the City and County of Honolulu of the state of Hawaii. It is situated on a former sugar cane plantation overlooking Pearl Harbor at 98-1276 Ulune St. The campus boasts the sculpture Early Spring by Satoru Abe.

Aiea High School's student body is made up of largely of persons of Asian or Pacific Islander descent.

Notable alumni
 Vincent Klyn (born 1960),  New Zealand-born actor and former professional surfer
 Joe Moore, American newscaster and actor 
 Maria Quiban (born 1970), American newscaster
 Tuufuli Uperesa (1948–2021), American football player

Complex schools
 Aiea Intermediate
 Aiea Elementary
 Pearl Ridge Elementary
 Scott Elementary
 Waimalu Elementary
 Webling Elementary

References

External links
 Aiea High School

Public high schools in Honolulu County, Hawaii
Educational institutions established in 1961
1961 establishments in Hawaii